El Vato is an American biographical television series based on the life of Mexican singer El Dasa and created by Endemol Shine North America and Boomdog Films for NBC Universo. The plot focuses of the story of Mexican singer El Vato and his friends in their attempt to triumph in the treacherous and seductive musical world of Los Angeles, California. The series stars El Dasa, Cristina Rodlo, Gustavo Egelhaaf and Ricardo Polanco. The first season of the series was broadcast simultaneously by Telemundo and by NBC Universo.

On May 19, 2016 NBC Universo renewed the series for a second season, which premiered on August 27, 2017.

Synopsis

Season 1 (2016) 
El Vato offers you a unique opportunity in your life to record the next great album that will give you the leap to fame, but in return you have to leave your simple life in Sonora to live under the brightness of the lights of Los Angeles and try to stay focused in the midst of all the temptations of the big city. For El Vato, it's time to jump to stardom or go home.

Season 2 (2017) 
The scripted-drama inspired by Regional Mexican singer El Dasa’s incredible real life story follows El Vato and his friends as they continue fighting for their dreams in Los Angeles in pursuit of a coveted spot in the Regional Mexican music world. After signing a contract, El Vato realizes he is trapped. Lolo Lozada (Horacio Castelo) the owner of his contract, only signed him to stop him from competing with other ‘norteño’ singers in his record label company. His friends, Mariana, (Cristina Rodlo), Brandon (Ricardo Polanco), and ‘El Pollo’ (Gustavo Egelhaaf) as usual will accompany him on his adventures but the journey to stardom will not be easy.  El Vato will have to face people who want take him down, deal with new love affairs and do the impossible to continue moving forward with his friends.

Cast 
 El Dasa as Miguel Cisneros / El Vato
 Cristina Rodlo as Mariana Gaxiola
 Gustavo Egelhaaf as El Pollo
 Ricardo Polanco as Brandon
 Itatí Cantoral as Wendy Lozada
 Mauricio Martínez as Marcos Gutiérrez
 Arcelia Ramírez as Doña Eli
 Mónica Dionne as Jackie
 Patricio Sebastián as El Vato child
 Leonardo Daniel as Emiliano Galeana
 Alejandro Calva as Don Jesús "Chucho" Durán
 José María de Tavira as Rogelio Galeana
 Luz Ramos as Roxana Sotomayor
 Ana Bárbara as Herself
 Paty Cantú as Herself
 Antonio de la Vega as Leandro León
 Sebastián Ferrat as Filiberto Cisneros
 Mauricio Isaac as Germán Lozada
 Giancarlo Vidrio as Joey
 Horacio Castelo as Daniel "Lolo" Lozada

Episodes

Series overview

Season 1 (2016)

Season 2 (2017)

Awards and nominations

References

External links 
 

2016 American television series debuts
2016 American television series endings
Telemundo original programming
Television series set in the 2010s
Spanish-language Netflix original programming
Television series by Endemol
Television series by Universal Television
2017 American television series endings